Abralia armata is a species of squid in the family Enoploteuthidae. It is native to waters of Indonesia and the Philippines. A. armata is reported to grow to mantle lengths of up to 2 cm.

References

Abralia
Molluscs of the Pacific Ocean
Cephalopods described in 1832
Taxa named by Joseph Paul Gaimard
Taxa named by Jean René Constant Quoy